Sir Pierre-Évariste Leblanc,  (August 10, 1853 – October 18, 1918) was born in Saint-Martin (today part of Laval, Quebec).

He was a Quebec Conservative Party leader but never premier. First elected to the Legislative Assembly in a by-election in 1882 in the riding of Laval, he served as leader of the Opposition from 1905 to 1908, when he lost the 1908 election and his own seat. Served as the 11th Lieutenant Governor of Quebec from February 12, 1915, until his death in  Spencer Wood, Sillery, in 1918. Leblanc was buried at cimetière Notre-Dame-des-Neiges in Montreal.

Prior to his political career, Leblanc was a teacher and a lawyer.

Elections as party leader
He lost the 1908 election.

See also
Politics of Quebec
List of Quebec general elections
List of Quebec leaders of the Opposition
Timeline of Quebec history

References

External links

1853 births
1918 deaths
Burials at Notre Dame des Neiges Cemetery
Canadian Knights Commander of the Order of St Michael and St George
Canadian King's Counsel
Lieutenant Governors of Quebec
Conservative Party of Quebec MNAs
Presidents of the National Assembly of Quebec
Lawyers in Quebec
Quebec political party leaders
Université Laval alumni